Santa Margarita, officially the Municipality of Santa Margarita, is a 4th class municipality in the province of Samar, Philippines. According to the 2020 census, it has a population of 26,816 people.

Formerly known as Magsohong, it is bounded to the north by the city of Calbayog and to the south by Gandara.

History
The town used to be a barrio in Calbayog named Magsohong, but on June 29, 1878, the principalía of Magsohong, petitioned the Gobierno Superior to establish Magsohong as an independent pueblo. They argued that Magsohong was four hours away from Calbayog, it already had a casa real or a Juzgado de Paz of nipa, a church with a techada (roof) of nipa; a convent; an escuela also made of wood and nipa; and had more than 300 tributos. The petition was endorsed by the cura parroco, the Gobernadorcillo as well as the principalía of Calbayog. Fourteen years later, Royal Decree No. 25 dated September 25, 1892 approved the establishment of the pueblo of Magsohong renamed Santa Margarita. The new pueblo had three visitas: Balud, San Bernardo, and Londara. However, it remained under the parish of Calbayog.

Geography

Barangays
Santa Margarita is politically subdivided into 36 barangays.

Climate

Demographics

Economy

Tourism
Arapison Falls
Baluarte
Burabod Picnic Grove
Calvary Hill
The Oldest Bell
The Oldest Natural Spring Water
Hell’s Fog Nature Oark
Mamitagaytay 
St. James Parish Sta Margarita

Culture

Alimango Festival
July 25 (Alimango Festival) - this dance festival revolves around the courtship between the female alimango (the mud crab Scylla serrata found in fishponds) Atabayi and the male Amamakhao. It also depicts the capture of the alimango with the use of the bobo and giant bentol (kinds of traps). Dancers, dressed as alimango, flex their hands as if to bite. Snare drums and talutang highlight the fast rhythm of the dance.

References

External links
 Santa Margarita Profile at PhilAtlas.com
 Official Website
 [ Philippine Standard Geographic Code]
 Philippine Census Information
 Local Governance Performance Management System

Municipalities of Samar (province)